Bo-ra! Deborah is an upcoming South Korean television series starring Yoo In-na in the title role, along with Yoon Hyun-min, Joo Sang-wook, Hwang Chan-sung, and Park So-jin. It is scheduled to premiere on ENA on April 12, 2023 and will air every Wednesday and Thursday at 21:00 (KST). It will also be available for streaming on Amazon Prime Video in selected regions.

Synopsis
The series is about the romance between Deborah, the greatest love coach, and Lee Soo-hyuk, a chic man who struggles with love.

Cast

Main
 Yoo In-na as Yeon Bo-ra / Deborah: a dating influencer and a star author who has a best-selling romance novel.
 Yoon Hyun-min as Lee Soo-hyuk: a picky but charming publishing planner who is displeased with Bo-ra, but begins to change as he unexpectedly gets entangled with her.
 Joo Sang-wook as Han Sang-jin: Soo-hyuk's best friend and business partner who is the representative of the book publishing house Jinri.
 Hwang Chan-sung as Noh Joo-wan: owner of a chicken franchise.
 Park So-jin as Lee Yoo-jeong: Bo-ra's best friend who is a lifestyle magazine feature editor.

Supporting
 Koo Jun-hoe as Yang Jin-ho: a young man in his 20s who is good at sports, singing, and cooking.
 Kim Ye-ji as Yeon Bo-mi: Bo-ra's younger sister.

Production
Bo-ra! Deborah was first announced under the tentative title I'm Serious About Dating as one of ENA's 2023–2024 lineup through the "KT Group Media Day" in April 2022. Filming began in the summer of 2022.

References

External links
  
 
 

Korean-language television shows
ENA television dramas
South Korean romantic comedy television series
2023 South Korean television series debuts

Upcoming television series